Marion Moise  (June 14, 1855 – Feb 1902)  was a prominent lawyer who served as a state senator for South Carolina from 1886 to 1890 and held various local offices in South Carolina.

He came from a prominent family. Edwin Warren Moïse (born 1832) was his father.

His son David DeLeon Moïse also held political office.

Moise committed suicide by firearm in early 1902.

References

1855 births
1902 deaths
19th-century American Jews
19th-century American lawyers
Jewish American people in South Carolina politics
South Carolina lawyers
South Carolina state senators
Suicides by firearm in South Carolina